Eksperiment (lit. Experiment) is a 1988 Soyuzmultfilm's satirical animated film about the bureaucrats directed by Yefim Gamburg and written by Michail Gurevich and Olgert Libkin. It was created in traditional hand-drawn animation technique.

Plot 
Experiment is set in a town, where the citizens were forced walk everywhere by foot because of constant traffic jams. To solve this situation, city officials decided to conduct an experiment: people were allowed to fly. Most citizens immediately grew wings and quickly moved to a new lifestyle, however, for some reason wings did not grow on few others. To find such wingless people a place for life, they decided to appoint flight supervisors and invented strict rules and regulations for the flights.

References 

1980s Russian-language films
Russian satirical films
Russian animated films
Soviet animated films
Soyuzmultfilm
1988 animated films
Films directed by Yefim Gamburg
1988 films